Yvann Thibaudeau (born April 4, 1973) is a Canadian film editor. He is most noted as a two-time Prix Jutra/Iris winner for Best Editing, winning at the 11th Jutra Awards in 2009 for Borderline and at the 21st Quebec Cinema Awards in 2019 for 1991.

He was also a nominee in the same category on two other occasions, and has been a five-time Genie Award and Canadian Screen Award nominee for Best Editing.

Filmography

Film

Television

Awards

References

1973 births
Living people
Canadian film editors
French Quebecers